Lin Meiring (born 22 October 1933) is a South African former swimmer. He competed in the men's 100 metre backstroke at the 1952 Summer Olympics. Meiring finished fourth in the 1954 British Empire and Commonwealth Games 110 yards backstroke.

References

1933 births
Living people
South African male swimmers
Olympic swimmers of South Africa
Swimmers at the 1952 Summer Olympics
Commonwealth Games competitors for South Africa
Swimmers at the 1954 British Empire and Commonwealth Games
Sportspeople from Pietermaritzburg
Male backstroke swimmers
21st-century South African people
20th-century South African people